Estadio Centenario Ciudad de Quilmes is a football stadium located in Quilmes, Argentina. The stadium, owned and managed by Quilmes Atlético Club, has a capacity of 35,200 people. It was re-built in 1998.

The Estadio Centenario was named in commemoration of the 100th. anniversary of Quilmes A.C. in 1987.

History 

The club announced the construction of a new stadium in November 1987, in commemoration of the 100th anniversary of the institution. Work began one year later and the stadium was partially opened in 1993 with a friendly match between Quilmes Campeón (with former players of the 1978 Quilmes champion squad) and an all-time stars combined team.

The stadium was officially inaugurated on April 25, 1995, with the name "Estadio Centenario 'José Luis Meiszner'". Meizner was then the president of Quilmes. Celebrations included a match between Quilmes and Uruguayan club Nacional, won by Quilmes 2–1.

On June 30, 1995, the Argentina national football team played for the first time in Estadio Centenario v. Australia, winning 20 with goals scored by Abel Balbo and Gabriel Batistuta. The stadium was refurbished and later re-opened in November 1998.

The old Quilmes stadium located on Guido and Sarmiento streets (behind the club's headquarters) was demolished. The stadium has been used by other teams such as Estudiantes de La Plata in the 2010 Apertura championship, which also won coached by Alejandro Sabella.

In 2016, the club (led by new president Marcelo Callelo) changed the name of the stadium to "Estadio Centenario Ciudad de Quilmes", removing the name of the former president after he was involved in the 2015 FIFA corruption case. Meiszner had managed the club for over 30 years, apart of being a close collaborator of Julio Grondona in the Argentine Football Association.

References

External links

 

Football venues in Argentina
Quilmes Atlético Club
Sports venues in Buenos Aires Province